Brachythemis contaminata, ditch jewel, is a species of dragonfly in the family Libellulidae. It is found in many Asian countries.

Description and habitat

It is a small dragonfly with brown-capped yellowish-green eyes. Its thorax is olivaceous-brown, marked with a reddish-brown humeral stripe and two brownish stripes on each side. Wings are transparent; but with a broad bright orange fascia extending from base to within 2 to 3 cells of reddish pterostigma. Abdomen is ochreous-red, marked with dorsal and sub-dorsal brown
stripes. Anal appendages are in reddish-brown. Female is similar to the male; but in pale yellowish-green color. Wings are transparent, tinted with yellow at extreme base;, but the bright orange fascia seen in the male absent. 

It breeds in weedy ponds, lakes, and slowly moving streams; especially in sluggish waters. It is very common along sewage canals, tanks, ponds and ditches.

See also 
 List of odonates of Sri Lanka
 List of odonates of India
 List of odonata of Kerala

References

 contaminata.html World Dragonflies
 Animal diversity web
 Query Results

External links

Libellulidae
Insects described in 1793